List of hospitals in Pakistan shows the hospitals in Pakistan by administrative region and city with links to articles in WikiPedia on notable hospitals.  According to 2016 statistics, Pakistan has more than 1200 public hospitals and 700 private hospitals. Besides these hospitals, there are also small Medical Clinics plus Maternity & Child Health Centers in different areas of Pakistan. The fees of public hospitals are marginal and affordable for all. However, private hospitals are expensive. All the doctors who are providing their services are certified and they all have a legal licence from Pakistan Medical & Dental Council (PMDC) to practice this profession.

During the COVID-19 pandemic, hospitals in Pakistan take all the necessary measures and tackle the pandemic very effectively. The sections below show list of some of the hospitals by administrative region of Pakistan with links to notable hospitals that have articles in Wikipedia.

Punjab 

Punjab is the most populated and industrialised province of Pakistan. It has almost 58 cities. Some of the most notable public and private hospitals in a few cities of Punjab are mentioned below.

Lahore 

The following are some of the hospitals in Lahore:
 Services Hospital Lahore
 Doctors Hospital
 Lahore General Hospital
 Jinnah Hospital
 Mayo Hospital
 Shaikh Zayed Hospital
 Shaukat Khanum Memorial Hospital
 Sir Ganga Ram Hospital

Rawalpindi 
The following are some of the hospitals in Rawalpindi, Pakistan:
 Armed Forces Institute of Cardiology
 Armed Forces Institute of Pathology (Pakistan)
 Benazir Bhutto Hospital
 Combined Military Hospital Rawalpindi
 Military Hospital Rawalpindi
 Rawalpindi Institute of Cardiology
 St Joseph's Hospice, Rawalpindi
 Holy Family Hospital
 Al-Shifa Trust Eye Hospital
 Fauji Foundation Hospital
Railway General Hospital Rawalpindi

Punjab-II

Multan 
The following are some of the hospitals in Multan, Pakistan:
 Children Hospital Multan
 Multan Institute of Cardiology
 Nishtar Hospital
 Railway Hospital Multan
 Women's Christian Hospital, Multan

Faisalabad 
The following are some of the public and private hospitals in Faisalabad, Pakistan:
 St. Raphael's Hospital
 Allied Hospital Faisalabad
 DHQ Hospital Faisalabad
 Faisalabad Institute of Cardiology
 Institute of Dentistry, Faisalabad
 Govt. General Hospital G.M.Abad
  Govt. General Hospital Samanabad
 Govt. General Hospital 224 R.B.
 Children Hospital Faisalabad
 Aziz Fatima Hospital, Faisalabad
 Wapda Hospital, Faisalabad

 The National Hospital Faisalabad

Other hospitals 
 Bahawal Victoria Hospital, Bahawalpur
 Bethania Hospital Sialkot
 Fazl-e-Omar Hospital
 Recep Tayyip Erdoğan Hospital, Muzaffargarh
 Shilokh Mission Hospital

Sindh 

Sindh is the second-most populous province of Pakistan. Karachi is the main city of this province. It has many public and private hospitals that are providing medical services to the people of Sindh.

Karachi 

The following are some of the public and private hospitals in Karachi, Pakistan:
 Abbassi Shaheed Hospital
 Aga Khan Hospital
 Aga Khan University Hospital
 Burhani Hospital
 Dr. Ruth K.M. Pfau, Civil Hospital Karachi
 Dr. Ziauddin Hospital
Health Oriented Preventive Education
Holy Family Hospital, Karachi
 Liaquat National Hospital
Marie Adelaide Leprosy Centre, Karachi
 PNS Rahat 
 PNS Shifa
 Jinnah Postgraduate Medical Centre (JPMC)
 National Institute of Cardiovascular Diseases (NICVD)
 Sindh Institute of Urology and Transplantation (SIUT)
 Karachi Institute of Radiotherapy and Nuclear Medicine
 Sindh Institute of Skin Diseases
 Indus Hospital
 Abbasi Shaheed Hospital
 Saifee Hospital, Karachi

Hyderabad 
The following are some of the public and private hospitals in Hyderabad, Pakistan:
 Liaquat University Hospital
 The Aga Khan Maternal and Child Care Centre
 St. Elizabeth’s Hospital, Hyderabad

Kotri 
 Bilawal Medical College Hospital, Kotri

Sukkur 

 Civil Hospital Sukkur
 Pir Abdul Qadir Ali Shah Jillani Institute of Medical Sciences, Gambat (GIMS)

Larkana 
 Civil Hospital, Larkana

Shaheed Benazirabad 
 Peoples Medical College Hospital Shaheed Benazirabad
 Benazir Institute of Urology and Transplant (BIUT) Shaheed Benazirabad
 Norin Cancer Hospital Nawabshah
 Child And Mother Care Hospital Shaheed Benazirabad

Other Hospitals 
 Gambat Liver Transplant Center

Khyber Pakhtunkhwa 
Khyber Pakhtunkhwa also known as KPK has well-developed hospitals, including the following.

Peshawar 
Peshawar has the following notable hospitals. 
 Hayatabad Medical Complex
 Khyber Teaching Hospital
 Lady Reading Hospital
 Shaukat Khanum Memorial Cancer Hospital & Research Centre

Other hospitals
Ayub Teaching Hospital
Institute of Nuclear Medicine, Oncology and Radiotherapy
Institute of Radiotherapy and Nuclear Medicine
Miangul Abdul Haq Jahanzeb Kidney Hospital
Saidu Teaching Hospital

Balochistan

Balochistan is the fourth most populous province of Pakistan. Hospitals in Balochistan include those listed below by city:

Quetta
Following are some of the hospitals located in Quetta:
 Civil Hospital, Quetta

Gilgit-Baltistan 
The following hospital is located in Gilgit-Baltistan:
 DHQ Hospital Gilgit

Islamabad Capital Territory

The following hospitals are located in the Islamabad Capital Territory:
National Institute of Health (Pakistan)
 Nuclear Medicine, Oncology and Radiotherapy Institute
 Pakistan Institute of Medical Sciences
 Quaid-e-Azam International Hospital
 Capital International Hospital

Azad Jammu and Kashmir (AJK) 

The following hospitals are in Azad Jammu and Kashmir:
 Abbas Institute of Medical Sciences

See also 
 List of cancer hospitals in Pakistan

References